Herbert Frankenhauser  (23 July 1945 – 6 May 2020) was a German politician, born in Munich, Bavaria. He was a representative of the Christian Social Union of Bavaria and a member of the Bundestag.

See also
List of Bavarian Christian Social Union politicians

References

1945 births
2020 deaths
Politicians from Munich
Members of the Bundestag for Bavaria
Members of the Bundestag 2009–2013
Members of the Bundestag 2005–2009
Members of the Bundestag 2002–2005
Members of the Bundestag 1998–2002
Members of the Bundestag 1994–1998
Members of the Bundestag 1990–1994
Members of the Bundestag for the Christian Social Union in Bavaria